Madhyattus is a genus of the jumping spiders found in India. It contains only one species, Madhyattus jabalpurensis.

Name
The genus name is a combination of Madhya and the common salticid ending -attus.

References

  (2007): The world spider catalog, version 8.0. American Museum of Natural History.

Salticidae
Spiders of the Indian subcontinent
Monotypic Salticidae genera